Bogdan Wołkowski (born 1957 in Jaworzno, Poland), nicknamed "The Wizard", is a Polish professional billiards and snooker trick-shot artist and entertainer, who has won many World Trick Shot Championships.

Titles and  achievements
1997 Slovakian Pool Trick Shot Championship
1998 World Pool Masters Trick Shot Challenge 
1999 World Pool Masters Trick Shot Challenge  
1999 World Snooker Trick Shot Championship
2000 World Pool Masters Trick Shot Challenge 
2000 World Snooker Trick Shot Championship
2001 World Snooker Trick Shot Championship
2002 World Snooker Trick Shot Championship
2002 European Pool Billiard Artistic Championship
2003 World Snooker Trick Shot Championship
2004 World Snooker Trick Shot Championship
2008 World Pool Masters Trick Shot Challenge

References

External links
http://www.wizardshow.com/ (in Polish)
https://www.youtube.com/watch?v=E_1BmziMS2Y - A great performance by Bogdan Wolkowski against Ronnie O'Sullivan

Polish carom billiards players
Polish snooker players
Polish pool players
People from Jaworzno
Living people
Trick shot artists
1957 births
Sportspeople from Silesian Voivodeship